The 2020 Bush's Beans 200 was the 16th stock car race of the 2020 ARCA Menards Series, the fifth race of the 2020 ARCA Menards Series East, the ninth race of the 2020 Sioux Chief Showdown, and the second iteration of the event. The race was held on Thursday, September 17, 2020, in Bristol, Tennessee, at Bristol Motor Speedway, a 0.533 miles (0.858 km) permanent oval-shaped racetrack. The race took the scheduled 200 laps to complete. At race's end, Sam Mayer of GMS Racing would complete a Bristol sweep, after winning the 2020 UNOH 200 on the same day. Mayer would win his fifth career ARCA Menards Series win, his eighth career ARCA Menards Series East win, his fifth win of the season in the ARCA Menards Series, and his fourth win of the season in the ARCA Menards Series East. To fill out the podium, Ty Gibbs of Joe Gibbs Racing and Max McLaughlin of Hattori Racing Enterprises would finish second and third, respectively.

Background 

The Bristol Motor Speedway, formerly known as Bristol International Raceway and Bristol Raceway, is a NASCAR short track venue located in Bristol, Tennessee. Constructed in 1960, it held its first NASCAR race on July 30, 1961. Despite its short length, Bristol is among the most popular tracks on the NASCAR schedule because of its distinct features, which include extraordinarily steep banking, an all concrete surface, two pit roads, and stadium-like seating. It has also been named one of the loudest NASCAR tracks.

Entry list

Starting lineup 
The starting lineup was determined by the current 2020 owner's points. As a result, Ty Gibbs of Joe Gibbs Racing would win the pole.

Full starting lineup

Race results

References 

2020 ARCA Menards Series
NASCAR races at Bristol Motor Speedway
September 2020 sports events in the United States
2020 in sports in Tennessee
2020 ARCA Menards Series East